Arctic Trucks is an Icelandic company with operations in the United Kingdom, North America, Norway, Finland, Poland, Russia, and the United Arab Emirates. They specialize in the re-engineering and after-market tuning of four-wheel drive vehicles to allow them to be used in challenging conditions.

They have supplied vehicles for a number of high-profile expeditions in the Arctic and Antarctic.

History
In Iceland, the difficult terrain led the locals to experiment with larger tires, and low tire pressures on the snow. In the mid-1980s, practical solutions began emerging and in 1990 Toyota in Iceland (P. Samúelsson hf.) established their own re-engineering division, calling it “Toyota Aukahlutir” (Toyota Accessories). Following the division's growth, 20%-70% of all new Toyota Hilux, Land Cruiser and 4Runners were re-engineered before delivery to customers. In 1996, this division was renamed to Arctic Trucks.

In 1999, Arctic Trucks Norway was established. In 2005, Arctic Trucks was separated from Toyota Iceland and began working more with other brands.

Additionally, Arctic Trucks offers tourism services through it's Arctic Trucks Experiences brand which is based in Iceland. Operating since 2008, the initial focus was on self-drive tours on the modified 4x4 trucks, but in recent past it has shifted focus to general adventure travel services and tours. It also offers support services to explorers, broadcasters and scientific surveys in the Arctic and Antarctic regions.

Arctic Trucks Engineering 

Arctic Trucks was established in Iceland in 1990 and specializes in the re-engineering and conversion of four-wheel drive vehicles for extreme conditions. Arctic Trucks have driven to both poles. They visited the North Magnetic Pole with BBC's Top Gear, and in the Antarctic, a fleet of four and six-wheel-drive vehicles are used by scientists to support their work. Arctic Trucks vehicles also set the record for the fastest journey to the South Pole in 2010.

Vehicle Categories and Services
Arctic Trucks offer 3 different categories of vehicle:
 Sports and Utility
 Professional
 Exploration

AT converts HiLux trucks to electric vehicles with 28 or 56 kWh battery for mining and construction.

Expeditions 
Arctic Trucks has developed and built vehicles to take on some of the world's biggest extremes. In most cases, the donor vehicle on which the expedition vehicle was built was a Toyota Hilux setup for 44-inch tires "AT44". The list below includes expeditions with Arctic Trucks vehicles. In most cases, Arctic Trucks has organized these expeditions with Arctic Trucks personnel.

International expeditions:
 December 1996 to January 1997 – Antarctica Expedition organized by the Swedish Polar institute. Two rebuilt Toyota Land Cruiser 80 on 44-inch tires supported scientific research, driving over 3000 km.
 May 1999 – Greenland. Three rebuilt Toyota Land Cruiser 80 in 44-inch drove over 800 kilometers across the Greenland icecap back and forth.

 April 2007 - Magnetic North Pole with BBC Top Gear. Two rebuilt Toyota Hilux AT38 along with one Toyota Land Cruiser AT38 drove from Resolute, Nunavut, Canada, to the 1996 Magnetic North Pole. The first and only time a car has been driven this way.
 November 2008 to February 2009 – Antarctica. Supporting a South Pole Challenge ski race and a crew from BBC filming the TV show On Thin Ice. With unexplored crevasse area and a route never driven before, four Arctic Trucks Hilux AT44 drove from Novo to South Pole and back with the film crew, doctors, and other service crew. The vehicles drove a total of 30,000 km on the high plateau of Antarctica.
 November 2009 - Antarctica. From Novo to 83:20 degrees in Antarctica, preparing a fuel drop.  Two Arctic Trucks Hilux AT44 drove over 3000 km each to service a fuel drop on the Antarctic plateau with temperatures falling well below – 50 °C. On their way, they scanned the route through the Shcherbakov Mountain Range with GPR.  When traveling, the vehicles averaged over 500 km per day.
 April 2010 - Iceland. Taking the filming crew of BBC Top Gear to erupting volcano Eyjafjallajökull.

 November 2010 – Antarctica. From the Indian scientific base Maitri to the South Pole and back, nearly 4700 km. Four Arctic Trucks Hilux AT44 carried scientists and equipment up to 3400 meter altitude with a measured temperature of -56 °C.
 December 2010 – Antarctica. Two Arctic Trucks Hilux AT44 took a team from Kazakhstan, Russia and Iceland from Novo to the South Pole and back. The expedition to the South Pole covered 2308 km and took only 4.5 days to complete.  Following their trail back, the return journey from the South Pole to the Novo runway took only 3.5 days, averaging 660 km per day.
 December 2010 to January 2011 - Antarctica. Four Hilux AT44 and two Hilux AT44 6X6 Arctic Trucks supported an Extreme World Races program with ZDF and ORF TV production teams filming the TV show Der Wettlauf zum Südpol, in which an Austrian skiing team competed against a German team for the last 300 km to the South Pole.
 November 2011 to February 2012 - Three Hilux AT44 Arctic Trucks, one 4x4 and two 6x6, started up from Fimbul Iceshelf, next to Novolazarevskaya, on an expedition that covered a total of 9500 km.  The expedition was set up by Extreme World Races and included multiple tasks.  First, supporting the team of an Austrian skier for the last two degrees to the South Pole, then crossing over to the Ross Iceshelf, making the first crossing of Antarctica between the Fimbul Ice Shelf and the Ross Ice Shelf, then returning to the South Pole and onwards to the Pole of inaccessibility, as defined by the Soviet Union Research. From there, they went back to the fuel depot at S83°23 E20°29E and the two 6x6 took a supporting a team from BBC filming Blue Peter headed to the South Pole. After completing this journey, both vehicles drove back to the Fimbul Ice Shelf, finishing a double crossing of Antarctica.
 November 2011 – Antarctica. Three Arctic Trucks, two Hilux AT44 and one Land Cruiser AT44, started from Novo runway and drove to South Pole, The Kazakhstan National Geographical Society visited the South Pole to celebrate the 100-year anniversary of the Scott and Amundsen race to the South Pole and then drove back to Novo Runway.
 December 2011 to February 2012 – Antarctica. Five Arctic Trucks vehicles, four AT44 Hilux and one AT44 Hilux 6x6, started off from Novo runway to support an Extreme World Races ski race for a film called “Cold Sweat”. To acclimatize to the thin air of the Antarctica plateau, the film crew, the competitors and the Blue Peter team received support from the 5 vehicles as they walked up through the Shcherbakov Mountain Range. When they arrived, three vehicles continued to the fuel depot at S83º23 E20º29 and met up with the double crossing team, and the two other vehicles waited with the group for the Basler to pick them up.  The Basler flew the group to the fuel depot now with 6 Arctic Trucks vehicles waiting having already prepared a skiway.  With 100 years since Amundsen and Scott raised to be the first to South Pole, 7 ski teams, including a teams from Norway and UK raised the last 780 km to South supported by 4 of the vehicles.  The last two vehicles supported the Blue Peter project. All vehicles then returned to Novo runway, three made the extra 15 km to the Fimbul Iceshelf. 
 December 2011 – Antarctica.  One Arctic Trucks built AT44 Tacoma was used to set a new world fasted time from Patriot Hills to South Pole, 1100 km distance. No Arctic Trucks personnel was on this expedition.
 November to December 2013 – Antarctica.  Four Arctic Trucks vehicles, two AT44 Hilux and two AT44 Hilux 6x6 supported a ski race between three teams of wounded soldiers, Walk With The Wounded.  The vehicles and the support team drove ahead 2000 km and set up a runway for the ski airplane bringing in the ski teams. After supporting and filming the ski race and both the film crew and skiers flown back to Novo runway but the car team was split in two, two vehicles went on to Ross Iceshelf to support Maria Leijerstam in her cycle attempt and the other two returned to Novo runway, laying out fuel depots for a Massey Ferguson expedition the following season.
 November 2013 to January 2014– Antarctica.  Two Arctic Trucks vehicles AT44 Hilux drove from Novo runway to the fuel catch at S83º23 E20º29, setting up ice runway, setting up and preparing for a fuel Para drop and servicing flights between Novo runway and South Pole.
 December 2013 – Antarctica.  Two Arctic Trucks vehicles one AT44 Hilux and one AT44 Hilux 6x6, double crossed Antarctica, Expedition 7 (http://www.expeditions7.com/) starting from the iceshelf below Novo Runway, to South Pole and onward to Ross Iceshelf. It took the team only 20 hours to drive from the Amundsen coast to the South Pole.
 December 2013 – Antarctica. One Arctic Trucks vehicle AT44 Hilux 6x6 took drove Parker Liautaud, Doug Stoup together with the film and support team from Union Glacier Ross Iceshelf, at Amundsen coast. Then they followed and filmed Parker and Doug as they walked unsupported to South Pole in 21 days, the fastest skiing time from the Antarctic coast to the South Pole.  After the skiing expedition the team returned to Union Glacier.
 December 2013 – Antarctica. Two Arctic Trucks vehicles one AT44 Hilux and one AT44 Hilux 6x6 drove Maria Leijerstam from South Pole to Ross Iceshelf at the Amundsen coast and supported her cycling to South Pole before driving to Union Glacier.  Maria set a new record as the first person to cycle all the way to South Pole. 
 December 2013 – Antarctica.  Two Arctic Trucks vehicles one AT44 Hilux and one AT44 Hilux 6x6, following the support of Walking With The Wounded, laid out two extra fuel depots on the route between Novo runway and South Pole for supporting a Tractor Expedition, "Antarctica2"  planned for the following season.

 November and December 2014 - Antarctica. Two Arctic Trucks vehicles AT44 Hilux drove from Novo runway to the fuel catch at S83º23 E20º29, setting up ice runway, setting up and preparing for a fuel Paradrop and servicing flights between Novo runway and South Pole.
 November 2014 – Antarctica. Two Artic Trucks vehicles both AT44 Hilux 6x6 supported Mano Ossevoort (the Tractor Girl) driving a Massey Ferguson tractor from the Fimbul iceshelf below Novo runway to South Pole and back.  This expedition was under the name of "Antarctica2" 

 January 2015 – Antarctica.  Two Arctic Trucks vehicles both AT44 Hilux 6x6, supported the Brazilian scientific research starting from Union Glacier 1.700 km drilling for and collecting snow samples in Ellsworth land for their research program.
 November and December 2015 - Antarctica. Two Arctic Trucks vehicles, one AT44 Hilux and one AT44 Hilux 6x6, drove from Novo runway to the fuel catch at S83º23 E20º29, setting up ice runway, setting up and preparing for a fuel Para drop and servicing flights between Novo runway and South Pole.
 December 2015 – Antarctica.  Two Arctic Trucks vehicles did a short expedition to Lake Undersee from Novo runway.  The expedition was for studying the route and as part of IAATO membership approval.
 November and December 2016 - Antarctica. Three Arctic Trucks vehicles, two AT44 Hilux and one AT44 Hilux drove from Novo runway to the fuel catch at S83º23 E20º29, setting up ice runway, setting up and preparing for a fuel para drop and servicing flights between Novo runway and South Pole.

 November 2016 to January 2017 – Antarctica. Two Arctic Trucks vehicles, one AT44 Hilux and one AT44 Hilux 6x6 established a land route between Novo runway and the landing site of the South African Icebreaker, Agulhas II, S72 º14 W02º42.  The expedition along the Fimbul Iceshelf crossed two large ice rises and the notorious Jutulstraumen Glacier. The expedition returned along the same route to Novo runway before searching for a land route to WolfsFang, a large blue ice area south of Kurze Mountains.  The expedition used 450Mz Mala ground penetrating radar and satellite imagery for navigating the highly crevassed areas.
 December 2016 – Antarctica.  Four Arctic Trucks vehicles, one AT38 Hyundai Santa Fe, two AT44 Hilux 6x6 and one AT44 Hilux drove from Union Glacier to McMurdo via South Pole and back with the great grandson of Ernest Shackleton, Patrick Bergel.  After visiting the Discovery hut where his great grandfather had stayed, Patrick and the team returned the same way back to Union, a total of 5800 km. This was the first car crossing of the Ross iceshelf itself. 
 January 2017 – Antarctica.  Three Arctic Trucks vehicle, one AT44 Hilux and two AT44 Hilux 6x6 drove to South Pole with a group of clients, all vehicles returned to Union Glacier.
 November - January 2017/2018 - Antarctica. Two Arctic Trucks vehicles, one AT44 Hilux and one AT44 Hilux 6x6, drove from Novo runway to the fuel catch at S83º23 E20º29, setting up ice runway, setting up and preparing for a fuel Paradrop and servicing flights between Novo runway and South Pole.
 December 2017 - Antarctica. Two Arctic Trucks vehicles scanned for a shorter route between the landing site for Agulhas II and WolfsFang
 December 2017 - Antarctica. Two Arctic Trucks vehicles drove from Union to Ronne Ice shelf and onward to South Pole.  Taking clients from South Pole to Ross Iceshelf and then return to Union via South Pole and Ronne Iceshelf making the first double crossing between these two ice shelfs.
 April - May 2018 - Greenland. Three Arctic Trucks vehicles, an Expedition7 in co-operation with Arctic Trucks made an expedition, the first vehicle crossing on the long end of Greenland from South to North starting at Isortoq reindeer farm, driving on see ice, over land, frozen rivers and lakes to the icecap, driving along the west side of the icecap, crossing over to the east side half way for fuel and then to the center up north to Wulff Land. The expedition returned south and came down of the icecap east of at Kangerlussuaq before driving Arctic Circle Trail to Sisimiut.
 December 2018 - Antarctica. Gamania Cheerup Foundation skiing challenge, three Arctic Trucks vehicles drove from Union to Ross Iceshelf with a team of 5 skiers and two film crew which documented the expedition and filmed the team successfully ski and bike the last 3 degrees to South Pole before returning to Union Glacier.
 December 2018 - Antarctica. One Arctic Trucks vehicles followed a Solar vehicle driving from Union Glacier 300 km towards South Pole and return to Union Glacier.
 January 2019 - Antarctica. Three Arctic Trucks vehicles drove from Union to Ronne Ice shelf and onward to Ross Ice shelf via South Pole with clients from Kazakhstan, Germany and China. The Expedition return to Union via South Pole.
 December 2019 - Antarctica. Three Arctic Trucks vehicles drove from Novo Runway to the fuel catch at S83º23 E20º29 to service a skiway, two vehicles did a 400 km food drop for kiters and return to Novo Runway.  One Arctic Trucks vehicle continued to South Pole and onwards to Union Glacier.
 January 2020 - Antarctica. Two Arctic Trucks vehicles drove from Union to Ronne Ice shelf and onward to South Pole. From South Pole the expedition drove to Pole of Inaccessibility before continuing to Nivlsen Iceshelf making a 4630 km crossing of Antarctica in 16 days.
 December 2021 - Antarctica. Two Arctic Trucks vehicles drove from Union through Hewitt Pass, West off and North along the Ellsworth Mountains onto the Antarctica Peninsula.   The expedition returned at S72°14 W64°12, driving back to Union Glacier making a 3000 km return journey. 
 December 2021- Antarctica.  Two Arctic Trucks vehicles started from Nivlizen Iceshelf (at S70°45 E11°54) carrying two Royal Enfield Himalayan motorcycles 90 South - The Most Epic Motorcycle Ride | Royal Enfied (royalenfield.com).  The team drove to South Pole and then towards Ross Iceshelf along the South Pole Traverse Road.   Off-loading the motorcycle at S86°16 W137°30, the team return to South Pole with the motorcycle driving.   From South Pole the expedition continued with the motorcycles on the vehicles to Union Glacier via stop at Ronne Iceshelf a total of  4400 km  
 March 2022 - Canada.  Departing 10th March 3 Arctic Trucks vehicles and 4 Yemelya Amphibious vehicles left Yellowknife along the Ingraham trail and north on the winter ice road.  Close to Diavik mine the expedition took of the ice road and made its way to Bathurst Inlet making its own route over land.  From there the expedition continued to Cambridge Bay mostly on sea ice.  Leaving one vehicle behind in Cambridge Bay the expedition continued to Resolute arriving there on the 22nd March.  Departing early 2 Arctic Trucks vehicles left Resolute 11am on the 23rd and at 10pm same day one vehicle broke through thin ice and sank to the bottom of the sea next to Tasmania islands, location N71°72 W96°36.   The driver and the guide escaped out of the vehicle unharmed but much of the teams’ tools and spare parts went down.  It was deemed to risky to continue to Cambridge Bay in one vehicle, so a helicopter was sent to recovery them, leaving the other vehicle behind on a close by island.  The vehicles still at Resolute drove back a few days later and took the vehicle left behind on the island with them to Cambridge Bay.   This was the first time Arctic Trucks used Ford F150 as a base for the AT44 vehicle setup for an expedition.  
 Aug 2022 - Canada.  Arctic Trucks planned a special recovery operation to retrieve the vehicle which sank in March expedition at N71°72 W96°36.  The operation had Gjoa Haven as base and counted on a heavy lift helicopter, Super Puma from Coldstream Helicopters to bring recovery team and equipment to the Tasmania Island and back.  The operation did go according to plan and the Super Puma carried the vehicle to Gjoa Haven.   A very small volume of transmission and gear oil did leak from the vehicle during its time in the Ocean.
 December 2022 - Antarctica.  Two Arctic Trucks vehicle did a double crossing of Antarctica starting at Union Glacier to South Pole via Ronne Iceshelf finishing the first crossing.   Returning to Union Glacier the same way doing 3900 km

External links
 Official website
 Arctic Trucks on YouTube < Arctic Trucks
 North America website
 Arctic Trucks Experience Website

References

Engineering companies of Iceland
Companies based in Reykjavík
1990 establishments in Iceland
Auto tuning companies
Auto parts suppliers
Technology companies established in 1990
Automotive motorsports and performance companies
Multinational companies
Icelandic brands